Prafulla Kumar Shil was a Bangladeshi  academic and politician from Khulna belonging to Bangladesh Awami League. He was a member of the Jatiya Sangsad.

Biography
Shil was the principal of Digraj College in Mongla of Bagerhat. He was elected as a member of the Jatiya Sangsad from Khulna-5 in 1979.

Shil died on 23 November 2014 at Abu Naser Hospital in Khulna.

References

1930s births
2014 deaths
People from Khulna District
Bangladeshi Hindus
Bangladeshi educators
2nd Jatiya Sangsad members
Awami League politicians